Kevin Smith (born July 4, 1996) is an American professional baseball shortstop for the Oakland Athletics of Major League Baseball (MLB). He made his MLB debut in 2021 with the Toronto Blue Jays.

High school and college
Smith graduated from Columbia High School in East Greenbush, New York, and later attended the University of Maryland, College Park. He played three seasons as the starting shortstop for the Maryland Terrapins. In his freshman season, Smith appeared in 66 games and recorded a .273 batting average, seven home runs, 35 runs batted in (RBI), and a team-leading 11 stolen bases. As a sophomore, Smith hit .259 with eight home runs and 34 RBI. In 2016, he played collegiate summer baseball for the Yarmouth–Dennis Red Sox of the Cape Cod Baseball League, where he hit .301 with 12 doubles and two home runs, was a league all-star and named a top prospect in the league by Baseball America, Perfect Game, and D1Baseball.com, and was named the Most Valuable Player (MVP) of the league's championship series after batting .500 with a home run and three RBI to help Yarmouth–Dennis win the league championship for the third-consecutive season. In his final year with the Terrapins, Smith hit .268 in 54 games played, and added 13 home runs and 48 RBI.

Professional career

Minor leagues
The Toronto Blue Jays selected Smith in the fourth round of the 2017 Major League Baseball draft. He signed for a $405,100 signing bonus, and was assigned to the Bluefield Blue Jays. In 61 games for Bluefield, Smith hit .271 with eight home runs, 43 RBI, and nine stolen bases. In 2018, he played for both the Class-A Lansing Lugnuts and the Advanced-A Dunedin Blue Jays, slashing a combined .302/.358/.528 with 25 home runs, 93 RBI, and 29 stolen bases in 129 games.

Smith played the 2019 season entirely with the Double-A New Hampshire Fisher Cats, hitting .209 with 19 home runs, 61 RBI, and 11 stolen bases. Following the season he played in 18 games for the Scottsdale Scorpions of the Arizona Fall League. He did not play professional baseball in 2020, as the COVID-19 pandemic led to the cancellation of the minor league season. In 2021, Smith was assigned to the Triple-A Buffalo Bisons, where he hit .286 with a team-leading 19 home runs and 63 RBI prior to being called up. He earned the 2021 Stan Barron Most Valuable Player Award, an award for Bisons team MVP, as voted on by his teammates.

Toronto Blue Jays
On August 18, 2021, the Blue Jays selected Smith's contract and called him up to the major leagues. On August 29, Smith hit his first career home run off of Detroit Tigers starter Matthew Boyd.

Oakland Athletics
On March 16, 2022, the Blue Jays traded Smith, Gunnar Hoglund, Zach Logue, and Kirby Snead to the Oakland Athletics for Matt Chapman.

References

External links

1996 births
Living people
Baseball players from New York (state)
Bluefield Blue Jays players
Buffalo Bisons (minor league) players
Dunedin Blue Jays players
Lansing Lugnuts players
Major League Baseball shortstops
Maryland Terrapins baseball players
New Hampshire Fisher Cats players
Oakland Athletics players
Scottsdale Scorpions players
Sportspeople from Troy, New York
Toronto Blue Jays players
Yarmouth–Dennis Red Sox players